John Russell (1626 – December 10, 1692) was a Puritan minister in Hadley, Massachusetts during King Philip's War.  As such, he is part of the Angel of Hadley legend.

Life
John Russell was born on 1626 in Ipswich, Suffolk, England  and immigrated to Cambridge, Massachusetts Bay Colony aboard The Defence in 1635 with his father and brother as part of the Great Migration.   He graduated from Harvard College in 1645.   In 1650 he succeeded Henry Smith as the minister at Wethersfield, Connecticut. Seven years later controversy erupted over church membership, discipline, and baptism, with the church in neighboring Hartford being inclined toward Presbyterianism as opposed to
Congregationalism.  The Congregationalist minority in Hartford attempted to join Russell's church in Wethersfield; when the General Corte prevented the move pending efforts at reconciliation, the controversy spilled over into Russell's congregation. Finally, on April 18, 1659, the majority of Russell's congregation signed an agreement to depart from Connecticut for Massachusetts.

In 1659 Russell led the dissenting Connecticut congregation that founded the town of Hadley on the east bank at a bend of the Connecticut River.  Beginning in 1664, he sheltered the regicides Edward Whalley and William Goffe in his home.  He secreted the two wanted men under the roof of his home for more than a decade at great peril to himself and his family, as King Charles II had numerous men searching the colonies for Whalley and Goffe.  Whalley died about 1675. Goffe was still alive during King Philip's War when, according to the Angel of Hadley legend, he allegedly came out of hiding to rally the townspeople during an attack before disappearing again.  George Sheldon in his introduction to Sylvester Judd's The History of Hadley dubbed John Russell the "Guardian Angel of Hadley" because of his lengthy and perilous watch over the two regicides. Sheldon eloquently wrote of Hadley's minister:

Family
Rev. John Russell's son, Rev. Samuel Russell of Branford, Connecticut, was one of the co-founders of Yale College. The Reverend John Russell died December 10, 1692 at Hadley, MA where he is buried in The Old Hadley Cemetery with his second wife, Rebecca Newberry Russell. See Find A Grave for additional information.

Legacy
Russell Street in Hadley is named after Reverend Russell. Russell Street is more commonly known as Massachusetts Route 9.

References 

1626 births
1692 deaths
17th-century Christian clergy
Kingdom of England emigrants to Massachusetts Bay Colony
American Calvinist and Reformed theologians
People of colonial Connecticut
People from Hadley, Massachusetts
Harvard College alumni
Massachusetts colonial-era clergy
Pre-statehood history of Massachusetts
17th-century New England Puritan ministers
17th-century Calvinist and Reformed theologians